Bogan is a surname. It is from ÓBoughain—a Cinel mBinnigh sept in Donegal and Waterford.  Variations of Bogan are Boggon and Boggan. Bogan originated from Ireland.Bog means soft land.

Notable people sharing the surname "Bogan" 

Louise Bogan (1897–1970), American poet
Lucille Bogan (1897–1948), American blues 

Gerald F. Bogan, Vice Admiral in the United States Navy
Ralph Bogan (1922–2013), American businessman
Tommy Bogan, Scottish footballer
Zachary Bogan, learned divine from Devonshire and Cambridge, who published "Treatises on the Idioms of Homer and Hesiod, as compared with the Language of Scripture," and some devotional tracts

Fictional characters 

 Elias Bogan, character from the X-Men comics series

 The Sega Genesis title Tommy Lasorda Baseball features a pitcher named Bogan

See also
Bogen (surname)

References